Randy "Duke" Johnson Jr. (born September 23, 1993) is an American football running back who is a free agent. He was drafted by the Cleveland Browns in the third round (77th overall) of the 2015 NFL Draft. He played college football at the University of Miami.

Early years
Johnson attended Miami Norland Senior High School in Miami Gardens, Florida, where he played football and ran track. As a sophomore, Johnson ran for 1,540 yards and 25 touchdowns. In his junior year, he led Norland to a 13–2 record and state runner-up. After beating the Sammy Watkins-led South Fort Myers 44–28 in the semifinals, Norland lost 44–34 to the unbeaten Tampa Jefferson in the class 3A final. During his senior year, Johnson compiled 1,957 rushing yards and 29 touchdowns, 14 receptions for 232 receiving yards and three touchdowns, three kickoff returns and one punt return for scores, as he led Miami Norland to 15–0 finish and state Class 5A championship. In the championship game against Wakulla, he scored five touchdowns.

He was also on the school's track & field team, where he was a standout sprinter and long jumper. He placed 5th in the long jump event at the 2010 GMAC Qualifiers, with a jump of 6.60 meters. In 2011, he placed 4th in the 100 meters at the 3rd Annual Miramar Invitational, recording a career-best time of 10.62 seconds. He finished 3rd in the 200 meters at the FHSAA 3A District 16, with a time of 22.31 seconds.

He was considered the best all-purpose running back recruit by Rivals.com.

College career
Johnson attended and played college football at the University of Miami from 2012 to 2014. In his freshman season, he rushed for 947 yards on 139 carries with ten touchdowns and caught 27 passes for 221 yards and one touchdown. He also threw an additional touchdown in a 41–40 loss to Virginia. He also played a major role on special teams, where he returned 28 kicks for two touchdowns.
In 2012, Johnson won both the ACC Rookie of the Year and Offensive Rookie of the Year awards. He became the first Miami Hurricane to win both awards.
In 2013, Johnson joined the Miami indoor track team, posting a personal-best time of 6.92 seconds in the 60 meters at New Mexico Classic. Johnson's sophomore campaign with the Hurricane's football team came to an abrupt end on November 2, 2013, when he broke his ankle against arch-rival Florida State. Miami lost that game 41–14. Through eight games, Johnson rushed for 920 yards on 145 carries, with six touchdowns. He also had four catches for 77 yards. Johnson returned from the injury his junior season in 2014 to play in all 13 games. During the season, he passed Ottis Anderson to become the Hurricanes' all-time rushing yards leader. He ended the 2014 season with 1,652 yards and 10 touchdowns.

After his junior season, Johnson decided to forgo his senior season and declared for the 2015 NFL Draft. He finished his college career with 3,519 rushing yards on 526 carries with 26 touchdowns, and had 69 receptions for 719 yards and four touchdowns.

Collegiate statistics

Professional career
On December 28, 2014, Johnson announced his decision to forgo his remaining eligibility and enter the 2015 NFL Draft. Johnson attended the NFL Scouting Combine in Indianapolis and performed a few combine drills before sustaining a hamstring injury. Due to his hamstring, he skipped the three-cone drill and short shuttle and voluntarily chose to skip the bench press. On April 1, 2015, Johnson participated at Miami's pro day and chose to perform the majority of combine drills, but elected to skip the broad jump. He improved his 40-yard dash (4.51s), 20-yard dash (2.57s), 10-yard dash (1.58s), and vertical jump (35") and also completed the bench press (18), short shuttle (4.16s), and three-cone drill (6.88s). Scouts and team representatives from all 32 NFL teams attended Miami's pro day, including head coaches Mike Tomlin (Steelers), Todd Bowles (Jets), and Sean Payton (Saints).

He also attended private workouts and visits with the New York Giants and Atlanta Falcons. At the conclusion of the pre-draft process, Johnson was projected to be a second round pick by NFL draft experts and scouts. He was ranked as the fourth best running back prospect in the draft by DraftScout.com and NFL analyst Mike Mayock, was ranked the fifth best running back by Sports Illustrated and Scouts Inc., and was ranked the seventh best running back by NFL analyst Charles Davis.

Cleveland Browns

2015
The Cleveland Browns selected Johnson in the third round with the 77th overall pick in the 2015 NFL Draft. Johnson was the sixth running back drafted in 2015. 

On June 16, 2015, the Cleveland Browns signed Johnson to a four-year, $3.10 million contract that includes a signing bonus of $710,092.

On August 1, 2015, Johnson injured his hamstring on the first day of the Browns' training camp. He was sidelined for the next ten days, and was inactive during the first preseason game against the Washington Redskins at FirstEnergy Stadium. During Johnson's first pre-season appearance, he was diagnosed with a concussion and was removed from the game. Throughout training camp, Johnson competed to be one of the primary running backs in the Browns' rotation against Isaiah Crowell, Terrance West, and Shaun Draughn. Head coach Mike Pettine named Johnson the backup running back, behind Isaiah Crowell, to begin the regular season. He replaced Terrance West after West showed up to training camp overweight and was released as part of final roster cuts.

He made his professional regular season debut and first career start in the Cleveland Browns' season opener at the New York Jets and had seven carries for 22 yards in their 31–10 loss. On October 4, 2015, Johnson had eight carries for 31 yards and recorded a season-high nine receptions for 85 yards and scored his first career touchdown during a 30–27 loss at the San Diego Chargers in Week 4. Johnson scored his first career touchdown on a 34-yard pass by quarterback Josh McCown in the second quarter. In Week 14, he had a season-high 13 carries for 78 rushing yards in the Browns' 24–10 win against the San Francisco 49ers. He finished his rookie season in 2015 with 104 carries for 379 rushing yards and 61 receptions for 534 receiving yards and two touchdowns in 16 games and seven starts. Johnson's 61 receptions are the second-most by a Browns rookie, tied with wide receiver Greg Little. Among rookies, Johnson ranked first in receptions and receiving yards among rookie running backs and second in receptions overall, just under Oakland Raiders' Amari Cooper. Johnson was ranked sixth overall among rookies in receiving yards and was one of six rookies to surpass 500 yards receiving.

2016
On January 4, 2016, the Cleveland Browns fired head coach Mike Pettine and general manager Ray Farmer after the Browns finished with a 3–13 record in 2015. During training camp, Johnson competed to be the starting running back against Isaiah Crowell. Head coach Hue Jackson officially named Johnson the backup running back, behind Isaiah Crowell, to start the regular season in 2016.

In Week 3, Johnson had a season-high ten carries for 69 yards and also caught five passes for 12 yards during a 30–24 loss at the Miami Dolphins. On October 16, 2016, Johnson had four carries for 18 yards and four receptions for 56 yards while also scoring his first rushing touchdown during a 28–26 loss at the Tennessee Titans in Week 6. On October 30, 2016, Johnson caught six passes for a season-high 87 yards and had four carries for 29 rushing yards as the Browns lost 31–28 against the New York Jets in Week 8. Johnson finished the 2016 season with 73 carries for 358 rushing yards (4.9 YPC) and a touchdown and 53 receptions for 514 receiving yards in 16 games and one start. Johnson served as a punt returner in 2016 and had 17 returns for 112 yards. He also had two fumbles and recorded two solo tackles in special teams.

2017
Johnson shared the Browns' backfield with Isaiah Crowell in the 2017 season. In Week 15, against the Baltimore Ravens, he became the first NFL running back since Herschel Walker in 1986–1988 to record at least 500 receiving yards in each of his first three seasons. Overall, he finished the 2017 season with 348 rushing yards, four rushing touchdowns, 74 receptions, 693 receiving yards, and three receiving touchdowns as the Browns struggled to only the second 0–16 season in NFL history.

2018

On June 7, 2018, the Cleveland Browns signed Johnson to a three-year, $15.61 million contract extension with $7.75 million guaranteed and a signing bonus of $3 million. Going into the 2018 season, Johnson shared the backfield with Carlos Hyde and rookie Nick Chubb. Through the first six games, Johnson retained his familiar role as a runner and catcher totaling 111 rushing yards and 14 receptions for 164 receiving yards. Before Week 7, Hyde was traded to the Jacksonville Jaguars. In Week 9, against the Kansas City Chiefs, he had nine receptions for 78 yards and two touchdowns in the 37–21 loss. Overall, he finished the 2018 season with 201 rushing yards to go along with 47 receptions for 429 yards and three touchdowns.

Houston Texans
On August 8, 2019, Johnson was traded to the Houston Texans for a conditional 2020 fourth-round pick that can become a third-round pick if active on the Texans roster for 10 games. Johnson made his debut with the Texans in Week 1 against the New Orleans Saints. In the game, Johnson rushed nine times for 57 yards and caught four passes for 33 yards in the 30-28 loss. Overall, Johnson finished the 2019 season with 410 rushing yards and two rushing touchdowns to go along with 44 receptions for 410 receiving yards and three receiving touchdowns.

In the 2020 season, Johnson appeared in 11 games and finished with 77 carries for 235 rushing yards and one rushing touchdown to go along with 28 receptions for 249 receiving yards and one receiving touchdown.

On February 26, 2021, Johnson was released by the Texans.

Jacksonville Jaguars
On September 6, 2021, Johnson was signed to the Jacksonville Jaguars practice squad. He was released on September 16.

Miami Dolphins
On October 26, 2021, Johnson was signed to the Miami Dolphins practice squad.

On December 19, 2021, in his first home game with the Dolphins, Johnson rushed for a career high 107 yards and two touchdowns in a 31-24 win against the New York Jets. The next day, Johnson was signed to the Dolphins’ active roster. He finished the 2021 season with 71 carries for 330 rushing yards and three rushing touchdowns to go along with four receptions for 41 receiving yards.

Buffalo Bills
On March 22, 2022, Johnson signed with the Buffalo Bills on a one year deal. He was released on August 30, 2022, and signed to the practice squad the next day. His practice squad contract with the team expired after the season on January 22, 2023.

NFL career statistics

Personal life
He is the cousin of professional basketball player Dewan Hernandez.

References

External links

1993 births
Living people
Players of American football from Miami
Miami Norland Senior High School alumni
American football running backs
Miami Hurricanes football players
Cleveland Browns players
Houston Texans players
Jacksonville Jaguars players
Miami Dolphins players
Buffalo Bills players